Sławomir is an Old Polish male given name of Slavic origin consists of two parts: "sława/slava" - glory, fame and "mir" - world, peace, prestige. Cognates include Slavomir, Slavomír. Feminine form is: Sławomira/Slavomira. Nicknames: Sławek, Slavko, Slavka, Sławka, Slava, Mirko, Mirek, Mira.

This name may refer to:

Sławomir Borewicz, fictional character in the Polish 07 zgłoś się television series
Sławomir Borowiecki, Polish figure skater
Sławomir Chałaśkiewicz (born 1963), retired Polish football player
Sławomir Chmura (born 1983), Polish long track speed skater
Sławomir Cienciała (born 1983), Polish footballer
Sławomir Drabik (born 1966), Polish speedway rider
Sławomir Fabicki (born 1970), Polish film director and screenwriter
Sławomir Idziak (born 1945), well-known cinematographer, working on over forty Polish films
Sławomir Jan Piechota (born 1960), Polish politician
Sławomir Janicki (born 1980), Polish ice dancer
Sławomir Jarczyk (born 1980), Polish footballer (defender)
Sławomir Jeneralski (born 1961), Polish journalist and politician
Sławomir Kłosowski (born 1964), Polish politician
Sławomir Kruszkowski (born 1975), Polish rower
Sławomir Kuczko (born 1985), Polish swimmer, whose specialty is the breaststroke
Sławomir Łosowski (born 1951), notable Polish synthesizer player in synth pop band Kombi
Sławomir Maciej Bittner (1923–1944), Polish scoutmaster and second lieutenant of the Armia Krajowa
Sławomir Majak (born 1969), Polish football coach and a former player
Sławomir Mordarski (born 1979), Polish slalom canoeist
Sławomir Mrożek (born 1930), Polish dramatist and writer
Sławomir Musielak (born 1990), Polish motorcycle speedway rider
Sławomir Nitras (born 1973), Polish politician
Sławomir Nowak (born 1974), Polish politician
Sławomir Olszewski (born 1973), Polish goalkeeper
Sławomir Orzeł (born 1979), popular Polish strongman competitor
Sławomir Peszko (born 1985), Polish footballer (midfielder), plays for Wolverhampton Wanderers
Sławomir Petelicki (born 1946), the first commander of the Polish special forces unit GROM
Sławomir Pytraczyk (born 1982), Visual Artist living in Canada
Sławomir Rawicz (1915–2004), Polish soldier arrested by Soviet occupation troops after the invasion of Poland
Sławomir Rutka (1975–2009), Polish footballer, in the defender position
Sławomir Rybicki (born 1960), Polish politician
Sławomir Sierakowski (born 1979), Polish left-wing publicist, sociologist, literary critic
Sławomir Skręta, the owner of the Polish record label Blue Star
Sławomir Szary (born 1979), Polish footballer
Sławomir Szeliga (born 1982), Polish footballer (midfielder)
Sławomir Szmal (born 1978), Polish handball player (goalkeeper)
Sławomir Szwedowski (1928–2000), Polish economist, professor at the Institute of Economic Sciences of the Polish Academy of Sciences
Sławomir Twardygrosz (born 1967), retired Polish professional footballer
Sławomir Wojciechowski (born 1973), Polish football player
Sławomir Wolniak (born 1988), Polish swimmer
Sławomir Zawiślak (born 1963), Polish politician

See also
 Slavomír
 Slavomir
 Slávek
 Sławosz
 Slavic names
 Polish name

External links

Slavic masculine given names
Polish masculine given names